Meix-devant-Virton (literally Meix before Virton; Gaumais: Minch-duvant-Vèrtan) is a municipality of Wallonia located in the province of Luxembourg, Belgium. 

On 1 January 2017 the municipality had 2,812 inhabitants. The total area is 54.2 km², giving a population density of 54 inhabitants per km².

The municipality consists of the following districts: Gérouville, Meix-devant-Virton, Robelmont, Sommethonne, and Villers-la-Loue. Other population centers include: Belle Vue, Berchiwé, Houdrigny, La Soye and Limes.

Geography 
It is located in the Gaume, near Orval Abbey, Avioth and Virton.

railway line 165 Athus-Meuse and the Chevratte, an affluent of the Ton. The national road 88 is linking Florenville and Athus (Aubange) and coming from Dampicourt in the south, it heads west toward Gérouville and the French border.

Demography

Security and safety 
The municipality is part of the Gaume Police Zone and the Luxembourg safety zone for firemen. The emergency number for those two services is 112.

Heraldry

See also
 List of protected heritage sites in Meix-devant-Virton

References

External links
 

 
Municipalities of Luxembourg (Belgium)